Lag Ja Gale is an Indian television series that premiered on 7 February 2023 on Zee TV. Produced by Fazila Allana and Sandiip Sikcand under Sol Production and Sandiip Films, it stars Namik Paul and Tanisha Mehta.

Cast

Main
 Namik Paul as 
 Shiv Dhoopar
 Aniket Dhoopar
 Tanisha Mehta as Ishaani Kulkarni

Recurring
 Aditya Deshmukh as Bobby
 Neelam Pathania as Mrs. Dhoopar (Shiv and Aniket's mother)
 Aryan Arora as Yash
 Tanvi Shewale
 Deepali Kamat

Production

Development
The show title is based on the song of the same name, from the 1964 film Woh Kaun Thi?. The series was announced on Zee TV by Sol Production.

Casting
Namik Paul was cast to portray the lead, Shiv Dhoopar. Tanisha Mehta were signed as the lead Ishaani Kulkarni.

Release
The launch event for the series was held on 4 February 2023. It premiered on 7 February 2023 on ZEE TV.

See also
 List of programmes broadcast by Zee TV

References

External links
 Lag Ja Gale at ZEE5

2023 Indian television series debuts
2020s Indian television series
Hindi-language television shows
Zee TV original programming